Enicmus is a genus of beetles in the family Latridiidae, the minute brown scavenger beetles.

There are about 50 species.

Species include:

 Enicmus alutaceus Reitter, 1885
 Enicmus amici Lohse, 1981
 Enicmus apicalis J. Sahlberg, 1926
 Enicmus aterrimus Motschulsky, 1866
 Enicmus atriceps Hansen, 1962
 Enicmus bifoveatus Broun, 1886
 Enicmus brasiliensis Mannerheim, 1844
 Enicmus brevicornis (Mannerheim, 1844)
 Enicmus callosus Rücker, 1985
 Enicmus caviceps Broun, 1893
 Enicmus claviger Johnson, 1977
 Enicmus cordatus Belon, 1895
 Enicmus crassipunctatus Fall, 1899
 Enicmus denticollis (A.M. Lea, 1906)
 Enicmus dubius (Mannerheim, 1844)
 Enicmus duplicatus LeConte, 1878
 Enicmus fictus Fall, 1899
 Enicmus floridus Brown, 1880
 Enicmus foveatus Belon, 1884
 Enicmus fungicola C. G. Thomson, 1868
 Enicmus guatemalenus Sharp, 1902
 Enicmus histrio Joy & Tomlin, 1910
 Enicmus kamtschaticus Motschulsky, 1866
 Enicmus kaszabi Rücker, 1983
 Enicmus laeviventris Fall, 1899
 Enicmus lundbladi Palm, 1956
 Enicmus maculatus Le Conte, 1878
 Enicmus mannerheimi (Kolenati, 1846)
 Enicmus mendax Fall, 1899
 Enicmus mimus Fall, 1899
 Enicmus montanoasiaticus Saluk, 1995
 Enicmus pampicola Brethes, 1922
 Enicmus planipennis Strand, 1940
 Enicmus priopterus (Broun, 1886)
 Enicmus puncticeps Broun, 1886
 Enicmus recticollis Motschulsky, 1886
 Enicmus rueckeri Johnson, 2007
 Enicmus rufifrons Broun, 1914
 Enicmus rugosus (Herbst, 1793)
 Enicmus sharpi Belon, 1884
 Enicmus strenuus Fall, 1899
 Enicmus sulcatulus Fall, 1899
 Enicmus tenuicornis Le Conte, 1878
 Enicmus testaceus (Stephens, 1830)
 Enicmus transversithorax Dajoz, 1967
 Enicmus transversus (Olivier, 1790)
 Enicmus ussuricus Saluk, 1992
 Enicmus vanus Fall, 1899
 Enicmus varendorffi Reitter, 1903
 Enicmus ventralis Fall, 1899

Fossil species include:
Enicmus adrianae

References

Latridiidae genera